A constitutional referendum was held in Estonia between 14 and 16 October 1933. After two new constitutional drafts proposed by Parliament had been rejected by referendums in 1932 and June 1933, a third draft proposed by the radical right-wing Movement of Veterans of the War of Independence was approved by 72.7% of voters, with a turnout of 77.9%.

Results

References

Referendums in Estonia
1933 referendums
1933 in Estonia
Constitutional referendums in Estonia